Pigeon English is the debut album by London-based experimental rock group One More Grain.

Track listing
All tracks written by One More Grain except "Northern" by Daniel Patrick Quinn

"A Shout In The Street" – 4:36
"Tropical Mother-in-Law" – 3:56
"Against King Moron" – 4:30
"Northern" – 4:50
"I'm On My Way" – 4:33
"Down Roman Road" – 5:10
"Won't Get Fooled Again" – 4:25

Personnel
Daniel Patrick Quinn vocals, synthesizer, guitar, violin
Andrew Blick trumpet, sound treatments
Dudu Froment bass
Gal Moore drums

2007 debut albums
One More Grain albums